Il fanciullo del West ( The Boy of the West ) is a 1943 Italian comedy film directed by Giorgio Ferroni and starring Erminio Macario. It is  named after Puccini's opera La fanciulla del West (The Girl of the West ) and is considered the first western parody in Italian cinema and the precursor of the Spaghetti Western genre.

Plot
In an imaginary country of the old west two main local families are in constant rivalry. Lolita del Fuego, courted by the head of a band of brigands, is instead in love with the scion of the rival family, Mac Carey who, through clashes, ambushes and shootings, manages to thwart the gang and to marry the girl, reconciling the two rival families.

Cast
Erminio Macario as Mac Carey
Elli Parvo as Lolita de Fuego
Giovanni Grasso as Donovan
Nino Pavese as Pedro Montes / Drake
Adriana Sivieri as Margherita Donovan
Egisto Olivieri as Carey
Carlo Rizzo as Fuller
Tino Scotti as Penna Bianca
Nada Fiorelli as Evelina Carey
Marisa Valli as Mary Carey
Aldo Pini as John Donovan
Piero Pastore as William Donovan
Renato Capanna as Sheriff
Vinicio Sofia as Pierre
Giovanni Onorato as Black
Gian Paolo Rosmino as Sorcerer
Erminio Spalla as Factor
Giulio Battiferri as Jim
Luisa Agosti as Fortune-teller
Oreste Onorato as Bandit

Release
The film was released in Italy on February 25, 1943

Notes

External links

1943 films
1940s Italian-language films
1943 comedy films
Italian black-and-white films
Films directed by Giorgio Ferroni
Italian comedy films
1940s Italian films